Eneli Kutter (née Vals; born 27 May 1991) is an Estonian footballer, who plays as a midfielder for Naiste Meistriliiga club Flora and the Estonia women's national football team.

International career
Kutter made her debut for the Estonia women's national football team on 12 November 2008 against Macedonia, coming off the bench and scoring once in the game that ended in a 1–1 draw.

References

External links

1991 births
Living people
Estonian women's footballers
Estonia women's international footballers
Women's association football midfielders
FC Flora (women) players
Tartu JK Tammeka (women) players